United Nations Security Council Resolution 45, adopted on 10 April 1948, after examining the application of the Union of Burma for membership in the United Nations, the Council recommended to the General Assembly that the Union of Burma be admitted.

The resolution was approved by ten votes to none, with one abstention from Argentina.

See also
 List of United Nations Security Council Resolutions 1 to 100 (1946–1953)
 Foreign relations of Burma

References
Text of the Resolution at undocs.org

External links
 

 0045
History of Myanmar
1948 in Burma
 0045
 0045
April 1948 events